The women's heavyweight (+72 kilograms) event at the 2002 Asian Games took place on October 13, 2002, at Gudeok Gymnasium, Busan, South Korea.

Schedule
All times are Korea Standard Time (UTC+09:00)

Results

References
2002 Asian Games Official Report, Page 733

External links
Official website

Taekwondo at the 2002 Asian Games